In mathematical logic, a propositional variable (also called a sentential variable or sentential letter) is an input variable (that can either be true or false) of a truth function. Propositional variables are the basic building-blocks of propositional formulas, used in propositional logic and higher-order logics.

Uses 
Formulas in logic are typically built up recursively from some propositional variables, some number of logical connectives, and some logical quantifiers.

Example
In a given propositional logic, a formula can be defined as follows:

 Every propositional variable is a formula.
 Given a formula X, the negation ¬X is a formula.
 Given two formulas X and Y, and a binary connective b (such as the logical conjunction ∧),the expression (X b Y) is a formula. (Note the parentheses.)

Through this construction, all of the formulas of propositional logic can be built up from propositional variables as a basic unit.

Predicate logic 
Propositional variables with no object variables such as x and y attached to predicate letters such as Px and xRy, having instead individual constants a, b, ..attached to predicate letters are propositional constants Pa, aRb. These propositional constants are atomic propositions, not containing propositional operators.

The internal structure of propositional variables contains predicate letters such as P and Q, in association with bound individual variables (e.g., x, y), individual constants such as a and b (singular terms from a domain of discourse D), ultimately taking a form such as Pa, aRb.(or with parenthesis,  and ).

Propositional logic is sometimes called zeroth-order logic due to not considering the internal structure in contrast with first-order logic which analyzes the internal structure of the atomic sentences.

See also 

 Boolean algebra (logic)
 Boolean datatype
 Boolean domain
 Boolean function

 Logical value
 Predicate variable
 Propositional logic

References

Bibliography 
 Smullyan, Raymond M.  First-Order Logic.  1968.  Dover edition, 1995.  Chapter 1.1: Formulas of Propositional Logic.

Propositional calculus
Concepts in logic
Logic symbols